Pterostylis hamata, commonly known as the southern hooked rustyhood, is a plant in the orchid family Orchidaceae and is endemic to eastern Australia. It has a rosette of leaves and between two and twelve transparent flowers with green and brown markings, a thick, brown, insect-like labellum and dished lateral sepals.

Description
Pterostylis hamata, is a terrestrial,  perennial, deciduous, herb with an underground tuber. Two to eight stem leaves are wrapped around the flowering spike. The lateral sepals turn downwards and are joined for about half their length and shallowly dished with the edges curved inwards. Flowering occurs from September to November.

Taxonomy and naming
Pterostylis hamata was first formally described in 1968 by John Blackmore and Stephen Clemesha from a specimen collected near Koorawatha and the description was published in The Orchadian. The specific epithet (hamata)  is a Latin word meaning "hooked".

Distribution and habitat
The southern hooked rustyhood occurs in the eastern half of New South Wales, the north-east corner of Victoria and in Queensland, growing in rocky places in open forest.

References

hamata
Endemic orchids of Australia
Orchids of the Australian Capital Territory
Orchids of New South Wales
Orchids of Queensland
Orchids of Victoria (Australia)
Plants described in 1968